

Helmut Wielandt (19 December 1910 – 14 February 2001) was a German mathematician who worked on permutation groups.

He was born in Niedereggenen, Lörrach, Germany.
He gave a plenary lecture Entwicklungslinien in der Strukturtheorie der endlichen Gruppen (Lines of Development in the Structure Theory of Finite Groups) at the International Congress of Mathematicians (ICM) in 1958 at Edinburgh and was an Invited Speaker with talk Bedingungen für die Konjugiertheit von Untergruppen endlicher Gruppen (Conditions for the Conjugacy of Finite Groups) at the ICM in 1962 in Stockholm.

See also

 Collatz–Wielandt formula
 Wielandt theorem

Publications

 

Among his work in Algebra is an elegant proof of the Sylow Theorems (replacing an older cumbersome proof involving double cosets)  that is in the standard textbooks on Abstract Algebra, i.e. Group Theory.

References

External links 
 Curriculum vitae from Mathematische Werke, Bd. 1
 Oberwolfach Photo Collection
 Prof. Dr. Helmut Wielandt
 

20th-century German mathematicians
1910 births
2001 deaths
Academic journal editors
Group theorists
People from Lörrach (district)